Paul Gallagher (born 16 October 1944) is a retired British trade union leader.

Gallagher grew up in Droylsden, Manchester, England. He began working for the Electrical, Electronic, Telecommunications and Plumbing Union (EETPU), and in 1986 was elected union president. He served in that role until the EETPU merged with the Amalgamated Engineering and Electrical Union (AEEU) in 1992.

Gallagher served as general secretary of the AEEU's new EETPU section for two years, after which time an agreement was reached that the EETPU section would elect a single general secretary for the union, while the AEU section would elect a president.  Gallagher was duly voted in as sole general secretary, but took early retirement in 1995 on health grounds.

References

1944 births
Living people
Electrical, Electronic, Telecommunications and Plumbing Union
General Secretaries of the Amalgamated Engineering and Electrical Union
People from Droylsden